Grenddy Adrián Perozo Rincón (born 28 February 1986), is a Venezuelan international footballer who currently plays for Monagas.

International career
A tough tackling, no nonsense central defender, who can also play as a defensive midfielder, Perozo is a current regular member of the Venezuelan full national team with 44 caps and has scored 2 goals.

International goals

|-
| 1. || 1 June 2011 || Estadio Mateo Flores, Guatemala City, Guatemala ||  || 0–2 || 0–2 || Friendly
|-
| 2. || 13 July 2011 || Estadio Padre Ernesto Martearena, Salta, Argentina ||  || 3–3 || 3–3 || 2011 Copa América
|-
|}

References

External links

1986 births
Living people
Sportspeople from Maracaibo
Association football central defenders
Venezuelan footballers
Venezuela international footballers
Ligue 1 players
Categoría Primera A players
Venezuelan Primera División players
Argentine Primera División players
Liga Portugal 2 players
Bolivian Primera División players
Trujillanos FC players
Deportivo Táchira F.C. players
Deportivo Anzoátegui players
Boyacá Chicó F.C. footballers
Olimpo footballers
AC Ajaccio players
Atlético Clube de Portugal players
Sport Boys Warnes players
Zulia F.C. players
Carabobo F.C. players
Atlético Venezuela C.F. players
2011 Copa América players
2015 Copa América players
Venezuelan expatriate footballers
Expatriate footballers in Argentina
Expatriate footballers in Colombia
Expatriate footballers in France
Expatriate footballers in Portugal
Expatriate footballers in Bolivia
Venezuelan expatriate sportspeople in Argentina
Venezuelan expatriate sportspeople in Colombia
Venezuelan expatriate sportspeople in France
Venezuelan expatriate sportspeople in Portugal
Venezuelan expatriate sportspeople in Bolivia